Matthew 20 is the twentieth chapter in the Gospel of Matthew in the New Testament of the Christian Bible. Jesus continues his final journey through Perea and Jericho, heading towards Jerusalem, which he enters in the following chapter.

Text 
The original text was written in Koine Greek. This chapter is divided into 34 verses.

Textual witnesses
Some early manuscripts containing the text of this chapter include:
Codex Vaticanus (AD 325–350)
Codex Sinaiticus (330–360)
Codex Bezae (c. 400)
Codex Washingtonianus (c. 400)
Codex Ephraemi Rescriptus (c. 450)
Codex Purpureus Rossanensis (6th century)
Codex Petropolitanus Purpureus (6th century; extant verses 7–34)
Codex Sinopensis (6th century; extant verses 9–34)
Papyrus 83 (6th century; extant verses 23–25, 30–31)

Structure

The New King James Version (NKJV) organises this chapter as follows:
The Parable of the Workers in the Vineyard
Jesus a Third Time Predicts His Death and Resurrection
Greatness is Serving
Two Blind Men Receive Their Sight.

Continuity with Matthew 19
The parable of the workers in the vineyard illustrates the aphorism in : Many who are first will be last, and the last first. Anglican theologian E. H. Plumptre argues that the division of the chapters at this point is "singularly unfortunate, as separating the parable both from the events which gave occasion to it and from the teaching which it illustrates. It is not too much to say that we can scarcely understand it at all unless we connect it with the history of the young ruler who had great possessions, and the claims which the disciples had made for themselves when they contrasted their readiness with his reluctance". Lutheran Pietist Johann Bengel argues, likewise, that a link is to be made with Peter's enquiry in : "See, we have left all and followed You. Therefore what shall we have?" 

The appointment of Jesus' twelve disciples to "sit on twelve thrones, judging the twelve tribes of Israel" in "the regeneration" may also be contrasted with the request of the mother of Zebedee's children, possibly Salome, that the seats of Jesus' right and left in the kingdom of heaven to be allocated to James and John.

Parable of the Workers in the Vineyard

This parable is only related by Matthew. It asserts that "the kingdom of heaven is like a landowner who went out early in the morning to hire laborers for his vineyard".

Verse 2
Now when he [the landowner] had agreed with the laborers for a denarius a day, he sent them into his vineyard.
Bengel notes that the landowner deals with the first group of labourers by legal contract, promising to pay an agreed sum, and with the others more by mere liberality".

Verse 16
So the last will be first, and the first last. For many are called, but few chosen.
The second part of this verse, For many are called, but few [are] chosen, is not included in Codex Vaticanus, Codex Regius, Codex Dublinensis or Codex Sinaiticus. The words are included in the Textus Receptus, and by Scrivener, and they appear in the King James Version, but they are omitted from the American Standard Version and the New International Version.

The journey towards Jerusalem

Verse 17
Now Jesus, going up to Jerusalem, took the twelve disciples aside on the road, and said to them,
There are three typical readings of this verse:
Jesus ... took the twelve disciples aside on the road, and said to them (New King James Version, cf. Geneva Bible, King James Version, Jerusalem Bible)
Jesus ... took the twelve disciples aside, and on the way he said to them (Revised Standard Version, cf. American Standard Version, Amplified Version, Holman Christian Standard Bible).
The words "on the way" are missing from the Latin Vulgate and from the Douay-Rheims Version:
Et ascendens Jesus Jerosolymam, assumpsit duodecim discipulos secreto, et ait illis:
And Jesus going up to Jerusalem, took the twelve disciples apart, and said to them:

Verse 20
Then the mother of Zebedee’s sons came to Him with her sons, kneeling down and asking something from Him.
The mother of Zebedee's sons, James and John, is known to have been Salome, "as we learn by comparing Matthew 27:56 with Mark 15:40". Her request is described as "ambitious".

Departure from Jericho
Matthew's narrative portrays the healing of two blind men taking place as Jesus, his disciples and a great multitude leave Jericho, although their passage back over the River Jordan and their arrival in Jericho are not described. The Ethiopic version, uniquely, reads here "as they went out from Jerusalem".

See also
 Parables of Jesus
 James, son of Zebedee
 John, son of Zebedee
 Related Bible parts: Mark 10, Luke 18

References

External links
 King James Bible - Wikisource
English Translation with Parallel Latin Vulgate
Online Bible at GospelHall.org (ESV, KJV, Darby, American Standard Version, Bible in Basic English)
Multiple bible versions at Bible Gateway (NKJV, NIV, NRSV etc.)

Gospel of Matthew chapters